Adorable Lies is a 1992 Cuban comedy film directed by Gerardo Chijona. The film was selected as the Cuban entry for the Best Foreign Language Film at the 65th Academy Awards, but was not accepted as a nominee.

Cast
 Luis Alberto Garcia
 Mirtha Ibarra
 Isabel Santos
 Thais Valdes

See also
 List of submissions to the 65th Academy Awards for Best Foreign Language Film
 List of Cuban submissions for the Academy Award for Best Foreign Language Film

References

External links
 

1992 films
1992 comedy films
1990s Spanish-language films
Cuban comedy films